Variant may refer to:

In arts and entertainment
 Variant (magazine), a former British cultural magazine
 Variant cover, an issue of comic books with varying cover art
 Variant (novel), a novel by Robison Wells
 "The Variant", 2021 episode of the TV series Loki
Sylvie (Marvel Cinematic Universe), a character who was originally referred to as the Variant

In gaming
Chess variant, a game derived from, related to or similar to chess in at least one respect
List of poker variants
List of Tetris variants

In mathematics and computing
Variant (logic), a term or formula obtained from another one by consistently renaming all variables
Variant symlinks, a symbolic link to a file that has a variable name embedded in it
Variant type, in programming languages
Z-variant, unicode characters that share the same etymology but have slightly different appearances

Computer security 

 In network security, varieties of computer worms are called variants.

In biology
 Allele, a variant of a gene
 In microbiology and virology, a variant, or 'genetic variant' is a subtype of a known microorganism.

Vehicles
Volkswagen Variant, an air-cooled station wagon produced until the early 1980s
TeST TST-5 Variant, a Czech aircraft design of the 1990s

Other uses
Variant name (geography), a name for a geographic feature that is not in primary use
Variant Chinese character, Chinese characters that can be used interchangeably
Orthographical variant, a variant spelling of a botanical name
Varyant, a road in İzmir, Turkey

See also
 Variety (disambiguation)
 Variation (disambiguation)
 Change (disambiguation)
 Variations on a Theme (disambiguation)
 Rate of change (disambiguation)
 Repetition (disambiguation)
 Variability (disambiguation)
 Variance